Chen Jia-wei (born 15 January 1985), better known by his stage name HUSH, is a Taiwanese singer-songwriter and lyricist.

He is formerly the vocalist of the Taiwanese band hush! He has worked with artists like A-Lin, Ding Dang, Lala Hsu, and Stephanie Sun.

Career 

While at National Pingtung Senior High School, he was the lead singer of the pop music club. His interactions with the guitar club, which included future members of the band Mary See The Future (先知瑪莉), influenced him to learn guitar.

HUSH majored in philosophy at Fu Jen Catholic University.

In 2009, he signed with HIM International Music as a singer-songwriter, but he wasn't able to sell any songs. He also competed in the 3rd season of One Million Star, which was won by Lala Hsu, but he was eliminated before the top 100.

In 2010, while working part-time at the coffee shop Kafka by the Sea in Gongguan, he met drummer Bearpa and bassist Kabei. Together, they formed the band hush! Starting out acoustic, they transitioned into electric after playing many live shows. Usually, Hush records the demo and uploads to StreetVoice, a music-publishing platform for independent songwriters. His songs are inspired by his interests in astronomy, psychology, and tarot.

Within a year, they released an EP, Astronomical Cachet 『天文特徵』, and an album, X. Popular in the indie scene, the band performed at various events and venues in Xi'an, Shenzhen, Taipei, Hong Kong, and Kaohsiung.

After the band disbanded in 2014, HUSH started his solo career. His first single was produced by Mayday bassist Masa.

Personal life 

He has interests in astronomy and tarot. He is a supporter of same-sex marriage in Taiwan, expressing his views in his song Same (同一個答案).
He came out during his concert on April 4, 2015. He's an avid participant of Taiwan Pride.

Controversy 
In 2015, the music video for his song King of Doubt (我想知道你的一切) was banned from television broadcast for nudity. Regarding the ban, HUSH felt that "it's good to open up a discussion about censorship and nudity," adding that "people can find it on the internet anyway." A VR version of the music video was also made.

Discography

Releases

Credits

Collaboration

Awards and nominations

Golden Melody

Association of Musicians in Taiwan

References 

Taiwanese Mandopop singers
People from Pingtung County
1985 births
Taiwanese composers
Taiwanese singer-songwriters
Living people
Mandopop singer-songwriters
Gay singers
Gay composers
Gay songwriters
21st-century Taiwanese male singers
Fu Jen Catholic University alumni
20th-century Taiwanese LGBT people
21st-century Taiwanese LGBT people
Taiwanese LGBT singers
Taiwanese LGBT songwriters